"The Parking Garage" is the 23rd episode of the situation comedy Seinfeld. It was the sixth episode of the show's third season. It aired on October 30, 1991 on NBC.

Written by Larry David and directed by Tom Cherones, the episode takes place entirely in a parking garage. It received overwhelmingly positive reviews, and was ranked #33 on TV Guide's 1997 list of the 100 Greatest TV episodes of All Time. The episode received a 12.1/19 Nielsen rating.

Plot
After Kramer purchases an air conditioner from a shopping mall in New Jersey, no one can remember where his car was parked in the multi-level parking garage. After carrying the air conditioner for some time, an exhausted Kramer leaves it behind one of the parked cars and tries to memorize the number of the parking space. Elaine fears that her new goldfish will die in the bag before they can arrive home, George must meet his parents by 6:15 to take them out to celebrate their anniversary, and Jerry has to go to the bathroom badly.

Elaine begs various people in the parking garage to give them a ride around the structure to find their car, but no one is willing to help. Kramer badgers Jerry to urinate in a corner where no one can see him. After Jerry reluctantly does so, he is spotted by a security guard and detained. Jerry tries to talk his way out of trouble by making up a story about a fictional disease of "uromysitisis poisoning", before telling the truth. Elaine, Kramer, and George split up to find Jerry.

George also gets caught in the act of urinating after being convinced to do so by Kramer. Both Jerry and George are fined and released. After the two find Elaine, Jerry convinces George to ask an attractive woman to give them a lift around the garage. The woman accepts, and they all enter her car and drive off. She kicks them out after George makes disparaging remarks about L. Ron Hubbard, not realizing she is a Scientologist. They are dropped off right by Kramer's car but Kramer, who holds the keys, is still lost somewhere in the garage, having gone to search for the air conditioner. By the time he gets back, Elaine's goldfish is dead and George is well past the deadline to meet his parents. They all get in the car, but the engine fails to start.

Production

The Parking Garage was written by Larry David, his fourth writing credit for the season, and was directed by Tom Cherones, his fourth directing credit for the season. It was filmed on the normal Seinfeld soundstage. The audience bleachers, Jerry's apartment and the restaurant set were removed to make room for the new set. Shooting was done from different angles so the entire set was shown. The stage was surrounded by mirrors to make the garage appear larger. Louis-Dreyfus and Seinfeld had their makeup redone between takes while lying on the ground because the shoot was so demanding.

Because Michael Richards wanted the shoot to be as realistic as possible, he insisted that an actual air conditioner be placed in the box Kramer was to carry around, so that Kramer's struggles were actually real. This got taxing as the shoot went on, and Richards also cut his lip while trying to load the air conditioner into his car.

The ending was scripted to have the gang drive off together; the car failing to start at the end of the episode was an accident. Richards continued to crank the car's ignition without success. It was decided that it was a much funnier ending, and it was kept in the episode as something else gone wrong. The other actors' natural reactions are visible as the car fails to start.

Theme
The episode follows the premise of the idea of Seinfeld as a "show about nothing". Holly Ordway of DVD Talk compared it to "The Chinese Restaurant" from the second season, which takes place entirely in a Chinese restaurant. Other critics also compared it to "The Chinese Restaurant", as both are bottle episodes.

Reception
In its original American broadcast, "The Parking Garage" received a Nielsen rating of 12.1 rating/19% share—this means that 12.1% of American households watched the episode and 19% of televisions in use at the time were tuned to it.

The episode has received overwhelmingly positive reviews from critics with many saying it is better than "The Chinese Restaurant". Holly Ordway called the episode "another classic Seinfeld episode" and also stated "the characters spend the whole episode in the same place resulting in an episode that's both memorable and funny." She also said it was better than second season's "The Chinese Restaurant". Colin Jacobson of DVD Movie Guide said "À la Season Two's "The Chinese Restaurant", this program uses one commonplace setting for its comedy, and I think it works even better than its famed predecessor".

Critical response
Linda S. Ghent, Professor in the Department of Economics at Eastern Illinois University, discusses this episode in view of its economic themes, specifically those of common resources, thinking 'at the margin' and cost-benefit analysis. The common resource here is the garage itself: it is for the public, but it is not supposed to be used by the public as a bathroom. Jerry decides that the relief (benefit) of urinating will outweigh the risk (cost) of getting caught.

Matthew Bond, describing how "singleness and childlessness" were, at the time the series began, "unusual for a situation comedy", writes that

Matthew Bond concludes, "In the Seinfeld world, others are unwelcome; parents are oppressive; friends married or with children are buffoons; children are monsters. Why should Jerry and Our Gang grow up?"

References

External links 
 

Seinfeld (season 3) episodes
1991 American television episodes
Bottle television episodes
Television episodes written by Larry David